Amelia Martha (Millie) Best MBE (29 April 1900 – 14 November 1979) was one of the first two women elected to the Tasmanian House of Assembly.

Best was born in Lower Barrington, Tasmania, Australia.  She ran an arts and crafts business in Launceston and was involved in the Voluntary Aid Detachment (VAD) Canteen Services during World War II.

She was elected to the House of Assembly representing the Liberal Party in the seat of Wilmot in 1955. She lost her seat in 1956, was re-elected in 1958 and lost her seat again in 1959.

References

Amelia Martha (Millie) Best MBE (1900-1979)

External links
 

1900 births
1979 deaths
Liberal Party of Australia members of the Parliament of Tasmania
Australian Members of the Order of the British Empire
Members of the Tasmanian House of Assembly
20th-century Australian politicians
20th-century Australian women politicians
Women members of the Tasmanian House of Assembly